Rustic architecture is a style of architecture in the United States, used in rural government and private structures and their landscape interior design. It was influenced by the American craftsman style.

According to the National Park Service, “The style of architecture which has been most widely used in our forested National Parks, and other wilderness parks, is generally referred to as "rustic.” It is, or should be, something more than the worn and misused term implies. It is earnestly hoped that a more apt and expressive designation for the style may evolve, but until it appears, "rustic," in spite of its inaccuracy and inadequacy, must be resorted to...."

Rustic Architecture related to national parks is sometimes referred to as Parkitecture.

Rustic styles and types
 National Park Service Rustic style which applies to U.S. National Park Service designed structures.
 WPA Rustic architecture of the U.S. Works Project Administration.
 Great Depression era park projects by the U.S. Civilian Conservation Corps and other federal entities.
 Adirondack Architecture and the Great Camps.
 Log cabins.

See also
 Rustic modern
 Pastoral
 Vernacular architecture

References

 
Architectural styles
American architectural styles
Canadian architectural styles